Irwin J. Landes (March 6, 1926 – May 27, 2010) was an American politician who served in the New York State Assembly from 1971 to 1978.

He died on May 27, 2010, in Tequesta, Florida at age 84.

References

1926 births
2010 deaths
Democratic Party members of the New York State Assembly